Giovanni Bajetti was an Italian violinist, conductor, and dramatic composer. He was born in Brescia about 1815 and died in Milan in 1876.

Bajetti studied at the Milan Conservatory and conducted at La Scala. Upon his death, he left several unfinished works, included a comic opera, La Donna Romantica.

References 

1810s births
1876 deaths
Year of birth uncertain
Italian violinists
Italian conductors (music)
19th-century Italian composers
Musicians from Brescia